Lemonia pia is a moth in the family Brahmaeidae (older classifications placed it in Lemoniidae). It was described by Rudolf Püngeler in 1902.

Subspecies
 Lemonia pia friedeli Witt, 1979
 Lemonia pia pia

References

Brahmaeidae
Moths described in 1902